Dacas v Brook Street Bureau (UK) Ltd [2004] EWCA Civ 217 is a UK labour law case, concerning the employment rights of agency workers.

Facts
Patricia Dacas had worked for Wandsworth LBC (on assignment through Brook Street plc) as a cleaner for four years. She was dismissed for apparent rudeness to a visitor. She claimed unfair dismissal against both Brook Street and the local council.

The Employment Tribunal held that Dacas had neither a contract of service with the employment agency, nor any contract at all with the council. On appeal, the Employment Appeal Tribunal held the Tribunal had erred in law, and found that Dacas was employed by Brook Street.

Judgment
The Court of Appeal, Mummery LJ, Sedley LJ and Munby J, held that Brook Street had been under no obligation to provide Dacas with work, and Dacas had been under no obligation to accept, and simply because Brook Street had paid her, this did not make Brook Street her employer. Instead the council had day to day control. So the Tribunal had been correct to find no employment contract between Dacas and Brook Street. Instead, it was possible for there to have been an implied contract between the council and Dacas, but this point had not been appealed. They thought an employment contract would exist between Dacas and the council after ‘considering all the evidence’.

See also

 UK labour law

Notes

References

United Kingdom labour case law
Court of Appeal (England and Wales) cases
2004 in case law
2004 in British law
London Borough of Wandsworth
Employment agencies of the United Kingdom